John William Showalter (February 8, 1844 – December 10, 1898) was a United States circuit judge of the United States Court of Appeals for the Seventh Circuit and of the United States Circuit Courts for the Seventh Circuit.

Education and career

John William Showalter was born in Mason County, Kentucky on February 8, 1844. He graduated from Yale University in 1867 and read law to enter the bar in 1871. He was in private practice in Chicago, Illinois from 1870 to 1895.

Federal judicial service

Showalter was nominated by President Grover Cleveland on February 25, 1895, to the United States Court of Appeals for the Seventh Circuit and the United States Circuit Courts for the Seventh Circuit, to a new joint seat authorized by 28 Stat. 643. He was confirmed by the United States Senate on March 1, 1895, and received his commission the same day. His service terminated on December 10, 1898, due to his death in Chicago.

References

Sources
 

1844 births
1898 deaths
Judges of the United States Court of Appeals for the Seventh Circuit
United States federal judges appointed by Grover Cleveland
19th-century American judges
19th-century American politicians
United States federal judges admitted to the practice of law by reading law